Porriño Industrial Fútbol Club, is a Spanish football club based in the municipality of O Porriño. Founded in 1933, they currently play in Preferente de Galicia – Group 2, holding home matches at the Campos Municipales de Lourambal.

History

Club background
Porriño Fútbol Club (1933–1943)
Club Zeltia Deportivo (1943–1965)
Porriño Industrial Club de Fútbol (1965–1983)
Porriño Industrial Fútbol Club (1983–present)

Season to season

20 seasons in Tercera División

References

External links
 
Soccerway team profile

Football clubs in Galicia (Spain)
Association football clubs established in 1933
1933 establishments in Spain